The 1901 Montana football team represented the University of Montana in the 1901 college football season. They were led by second-year head coach Frank Bean, and finished the season with a record of two wins and three losses (2–3).

Schedule

Notes

 The final scores for the loss against Fort Shaw Indian School and their first victory over Fort Missoula are both unknown.

References

Montana
Montana Grizzlies football seasons
Montana football